Maureen Elizabeth Reagan (January 4, 1941 – August 8, 2001) was an American political activist and the first child of U.S. president Ronald Reagan and his first wife, actress Jane Wyman. Her brother is Michael Reagan and her half-siblings are Patti Davis and Ron Reagan, from her father's second marriage (to Nancy Reagan).

Early life
Reagan was born January 4, 1941, in Los Angeles, where she was raised. She graduated from Marymount Secondary School, Tarrytown, New York in 1958 and briefly attended Marymount University in Virginia. She worked for Walker & Dunlop and entered the Miss Washington competition in 1959.

Her parents also had another daughter, Christine, who died shortly after birth.

Acting career
Reagan pursued a career in acting in her youth, appearing in films such as Kissin' Cousins (1964) in which she featured alongside Elvis Presley.

Political activities
Reagan was the first son or daughter of a President to be elected cochair of the Republican National Committee. However, both of her attempts at election to political office ended in defeat. She ran unsuccessfully for the United States Senate from California in 1982 (which was eventually won by Pete Wilson) and in 1992 for California's 36th congressional district.

Although they maintained a united front, Maureen Reagan differed from her father on several key issues. Although reared Roman Catholic following her mother's conversion, she was pro-choice on abortion. She also held the belief that Oliver North should have been court-martialed.

After her father announced his diagnosis of Alzheimer's disease in 1994, Maureen Reagan became a member of the Alzheimer's Association board of directors and served as the group's spokeswoman. While hospitalized for melanoma cancer towards the end of her life, Maureen was only floors away from her father who had suffered a severe fall.

Personal life

In 1960, Maureen's by-then divorced parents became concerned about her. Ronald Reagan used his connections at the FBI − established during his work as an anti-communist informant − to request the agency to investigate her romantic life. The agency did so on condition that the FBI not be cited as a source, and reported that she was living with an older, married man who was a police officer.

Maureen Reagan was married three times:
John Filippone, a policeman; they were married in 1961 and divorced the following year.
David G. Sills, a lawyer and Marine Corps officer; they married on February 28, 1964; the couple divorced in 1967.
Dennis C. Revell, CEO of Revell Communications (a national public relations/public affairs firm), whom she married on April 25, 1981. She and Revell adopted one daughter, Margaret "Rita" Mirembe Revell, who was born in Uganda. The Revells became Rita's guardians in 1994. They adopted her in 2001. Rita was the beneficiary of a private bill to facilitate her adoption as Maureen and Dennis Revell were unable to complete the necessary paperwork and other requirements by the Ugandan government, including a personal visitation to that country, due, in large part, to Maureen Reagan Revell's terminal cancer.

Death
Reagan died in Granite Bay, California, on August 8, 2001, aged 60, from melanoma. She is interred at Calvary Catholic Cemetery and Mausoleum in Sacramento, California.

Reagan volunteered with actor David Hyde Pierce, of TV's Frasier, at the Alzheimer's Association. At her funeral on August 19, 2001, Pierce spoke to the mourners at the Cathedral of the Blessed Sacrament in Sacramento, and recalled his friend's attitude to her illness. "When she was given lemons, she did not make lemonade. She took the lemons, threw them back and said, 'Oh, no you don't.'"

References

External links
 
 
 

1941 births
2001 deaths
20th-century American actresses
21st-century American women
Activists from California
American feminists
American film actresses
American health activists
Actresses from Los Angeles
California Republicans
Deaths from cancer in California
Children of presidents of the United States
Converts to Roman Catholicism
Deaths from melanoma
People from Granite Bay, California
Actresses from Sacramento, California
Reagan family
Women in California politics
Catholics from California